Lu Ruilin (1911–1999) was a People's Republic of China politician and People's Liberation Army major general. He was born in Linxia County, Gansu Province. He was Chinese Communist Party Committee Secretary and governor of Guizhou Province.

References
少将鲁瑞林. 临夏网. [2012-05-13].
鲁瑞林 挥师解放大西南. 中国甘肃网. [2012-05-13].

1911 births
1999 deaths
People's Republic of China politicians from Gansu
Chinese Communist Party politicians from Gansu
People's Liberation Army generals from Gansu
Governors of Guizhou
Political office-holders in Guizhou